The Valckenburg Baronetcy, of Middleing in the County of York, was a title in the Baronetage of England.  It was created on 20 July 1642 for Matthew Valckenburg.  The title became extinct upon the death of the second Baronet in 1679.

Valckenburg baronets, of Middleing (1642)
Sir Matthew Valckenburg, 1st Baronet (died 1644)
Sir John Anthony van Valckenburg, 2nd Baronet (died 1679)

References
 

Extinct baronetcies in the Baronetage of England